The 5th Bodil Awards ceremony was held in 1952 in Copenhagen, Denmark, honouring the best national and foreign films of 1951. The event had moved from Palace Hotel's night club Ambassadeur to a local cinema where All the King's Men had its Danish premiere as part of the celebrations.

Bodil Ipsen and Lau Lauritzen, Jr. won their third Bodil for Best Danish Film in the 5-years history of the awards for Det Sande Ansigt. Bodil Kjær won the award for Best Leading Actress for her role in Meet Me on Cassiopeia. Eighty-four-year-old Sigrid Neiiendam won the award for Best Supporting Actress for her role in Fra den gamle købmandsgård. The awards for Best Leading and Supporting Actor were not awarded. The tabloid BT subsequently referred to her as "the oldest film award winner in the World".

Winners

See also 
 Robert Awards

References

External links 
 Official website

1951 film awards
1952 in Denmark
Bodil Awards ceremonies
1950s in Copenhagen